The 2018 season was the twenty second season in the club's participation in the Canadian Soccer League (including Canadian National Soccer League days). Their season began on May 25, 2018 in a home match against FC Vorkuta, which resulted in a 1-1 draw. Before the commencement of the outdoor season the White Eagles became a founding member in the Arena Premier League as an indoor team. Throughout the regular CSL season the Serbs struggled to compete for a top four position as their performance declined in the later stages. The club still managed to secure a postseason berth, but saw an early departure after a defeat to SC Waterloo Region in the opening round. The club's top goalscorer was Luka Bojić with five goals.

Summary  
In the winter of 2017 the Arena Premier League was formed, and the Serbian White Eagles became involved in the indoor soccer realm as a founding member under the name of Serbia AS. During the indoor season the club selected Milan Mijailović as the new head coach. In their debut season in the APL the Serbs clinched a playoff by finishing fourth in the standings. Before the commencement of the 2018 outdoor season Mijailović maintained the majority of the European veterans in his formation of the roster. In the earlier rounds of the season Toronto achieved a five game undefeated streak, and maintained a strong presence in the top four. Unfortunately their performance dwindled in the final segment of the season, but still managed to secure a postseason by finishing sixth in the First Division. 

In the postseason the Serbs were eliminated in the opening round to SC Waterloo Region. While in the Second Division their reserve team finished sixth in the standings as a result failed to secure a playoff berth.

Team

First Division roster

Second Division roster

Management

Competitions

Canadian Soccer League

First Division

Results summary

Results by round

Matches

Postseason

Second Division

Results summary

Results by round

Matches

Statistics

Goals 
Correct as of October 13, 2018

References 
 

 
Serbian White Eagles FC seasons
Serbian White Eagles FC
Serbian White Eagles FC
Serbian White Eagles FC